The Regional Investment Company of Wallonia (French: Société Régionale d'Investissement de Wallonie or SRIW) was founded by the Walloon Region in 1979 to provide capital to the Walloon industry. The purpose of the SRIW, based in Liège, is to invest in the equity of unlisted companies (private equity). The SRIW acts either by purchasing shares of companies, by increasing the capital of the business, by subscribing to a bond issue, or by granting subordinated or convertible loans.

See also
 Brussels Regional Investment Company
 Economy of Belgium
 GIMV
 Science and technology in Flanders
 Science and technology in Wallonia
 Sillon industriel
 SOWALFIN
 Walloon Export and Foreign Investment Agency

External links
 Regional Investment Company of Wallonia
 Invest in Wallonia
 Facts from Belgium

Investment companies of Belgium
Companies based in Liège Province
Wallonia
Government agencies of Belgium